Helsinki Times is the first English language daily online newspaper in Finland providing news about Finland and the world for English-speaking readers resident in the country. A weekly printed edition was issued between 2007 and 2015.

History and profile

Helsinki Times was established in April 2007 by Iranian-born doctor, writer, journalist and director Alexis Kouros who settled in Finland in 1990. A paper version was published in tabloid format. and was eventually discontinued in February 2015. However, until today, helsinkitimes.fi is updated several times per day with domestic news about Finland in English, resulting in a huge archive of Finland related articles compiled of a good number of original and translated articles.

Helsinki Times has had partnerships with The New York Times, The Washington Post, CNN, Reuters, Inter Press Service, People's Daily, and other prominent international media outlets. Columns and articles from these media had been published in Helsinki Times regularly and some of them advertised their sites and services in Helsinki Times.
Domestically, Helsinki Times partnered with Finland's main newspaper, Helsingin Sanomat, where Helsinki Times was the official English language edition of Helsingin Sanomat. During that partnership, which lasted from 2014 to 2016, in addition to its original columns and articles, some articles from the Finnish paper were translated and published in English on the website of Helsinki Times.

Today
Nowadays, Helsinki Times is a free online newspaper published by media company Dream Catcher, which can be read without subscription.  The site has more than 300 000 unique visitors each month. Notable guest columnists included Mikhail Gorbachev, Dilma Rousseff, Calestous Juma, Pekka Haavisto, Yuri Fedotov, Cynthia McKinney, Giovanni Buttarelli, Jutta Urpilainen, Sanni Grahn-Laasonen, Bill Durodié, Veltto Virtanen, and Maria Guzenina.

Readers are mainly expats, diplomats and immigrants residing in Finland, but the site is visited by a considerable number of readers, who have commercial or personal interest in Finland's affairs. The official Facebook page is updated several times per day and has over 12 000 Likes.

Apart from Helsinki Times, award-winning documentaries and TV series, and books, Dream Catcher is also publishing SixDegrees, an online service featuring articles and columns about lifestyle, culture, society, as well as interviews and weekly guest contributions by immigrants in Finland.

In 2020 and 2021, the newssite has sections for China News in English and Simplified Chinese, whose articles are provided directly by People's Daily, and which have downplayed the Xinjiang internment camps and published Chinese-written disinformation about Covid-19. It defended the arrangement as an attempt to balance allegedly biased Western media reports. Helsinki Times also published Seymour Hersh report about Nord Stream.

See also
 List of newspapers in Finland

References

External links
Official site
SixDegrees - Finland's English Language Magazine

2007 establishments in Finland
English-language newspapers published in Europe
Finnish news websites
Newspapers published in Helsinki
Daily newspapers published in Finland
Publications established in 2007
Publications disestablished in 2015
Weekly newspapers published in Finland
2015 disestablishments in Finland
Online newspapers with defunct print editions
Defunct newspapers published in Finland